Liette Vasseur (born 29 April 1963, in Laval, Quebec) is a Canadian biologist who has held the UNESCO Chair in Community Sustainability: From Local to Global in the Department of Biological Sciences since 2014 (renewed in 2018) at Brock University in St. Catharines, Ontario, Canada. She is also a member of the Women and Gender Studies program and the Environmental Sustainability Research Centre. She is the President of the Canadian Commission for UNESCO.

Childhood and education 
Vasseur was born on April 29, 1963, on a farm in Laval, north of Montreal. Her father and paternal grandfather were florists.

Liette's primary studies began in 1969 at John XXIII School and Simon Vanier School. She did her first two years of secondary school at St-Martin and finally completed her third, fourth and fifth year at St-Maxime. She did her CEGEP at Ahuntsic College.

She graduated from Sherbrooke University with a degree in biology and ecology. She graduated in 1985.

Liette then studied biology at the University of Quebec in Montreal (UQAM) where she graduated in 1987. She then worked on the conservation of wild garlic. She was able to do part of a research team at the Université de Montréal in population genetics with Jean-Pierre Simon.

She then completed her Ph.D. in biology at Queen's University (Kingston, Ontario) and graduated in 1991. She eventually began a postdoctoral fellowship with Catherine Potvin at McGill University.

Career 
Vasseur, who trained in Ecology has developed an interdisciplinary research programme with links to issues such as community-based ecosystem management, climate change adaptation and resilience and sustainable agriculture both nationally and internationally.

In Canada, her research areas include impacts of climate change including extreme events on natural and managed ecosystems as well as rural communities, use of new alternatives in sustainable agriculture, and ecosystem/landscape sustainable development, conservation, and resilience in rural communities in Canada and abroad.

She was part of the co-direction committee of a large project on Coastal Communities Challenges in the face of Climate Change, funded by the Social and Humanities Research Council of Canada, which looked at resilience and ecosystem-based adaptations in ten coastal communities of Atlantic Canada.  

She also works in China, where she is a Minjiang Scholar at Fujian Agriculture and Forestry University, and in Ecuador, where she focuses on the community sustainability and ecosystem-based adaptation to climate change of rural native communities in the Andean region of the Chimborazo.  

Vasseur has also been involved in projects in other countries such as Vietnam, Cambodia, Panama, Brazil, Burkina Faso, in Africa.

Since June 2018, she has been the President of the Canadian Commission for UNESCO, where she was previously Chair of the Sectoral Commission on Social, Human and Natural Sciences. She is the vice-chair for North America on the steering committee of the Commission for Ecosystem Management at the International Union for Conservation of Nature and leads the thematic group on Ecosystem Governance.

Publications 

She has produced over one hundred publications and more than 250 presentations as a researcher.

 Vasseur, L. 2018. Learning the role of biodiversity monitoring in a biosphere reserve. International Journal of UNESCO Biosphere Reserves 2 (1) (published April 2018): 18–21.

 Vasseur, L. 2011. Moving from research into action on issues of climate change for a Canadian community: integration of sciences into decision making. The International Journal of     Climate Change: Impacts and Responses 2:115-126.
 Vasseur, L. 2009.     Avant-propos: Interdisciplinarité... ou va-t-on se perdre dans le bois?     Revue de l’Université de Moncton 40 : 121-131(published April 2011). 
 Vasseur,     L. and W. Hart. 2002. A basic theoretical framework for community-based     conservation management in China and Vietnam. International Journal     Sustainable Development of World Ecology 9: 41–47. (accepted without revision)
 Vasseur,     L. 2001. Allozymic diversity of Allium     tricoccum Solander var. burdickii     Hanes in isolated populations of Nova Scotia (Canada). Plant Syst. Evol. 228:     71–79.
 Vasseur,     L., R. Guscott and P. Mudie. 2001. Monitoring of spring flower phenology     in Nova Scotia: Trends for the last century. Northeastern Naturalist 8:     393–402.
 Vasseur, L., C. Cloutier and C. Ansseau. 2000. Effects     of repeated sewage sludge application on plant community diversity and     structure under agricultural field conditions on Podxolic soils in eastern     Quebec. Agriculture, Ecosystem and Environment 81: 209–216.
 Vasseur, L., B. Shipley and C. Ansseau. 1999. Chemical composition of municipal sewage     sludge in southern Quebec: is there a potential for agricultural soil     application? Can. J. Wat. Res. 34: 469–480.
 Vasseur, L., M.J. Fortin and J. Cyr. 1998. The use of clover and cress as two indicator     species in the evaluation of impacts of lime sewage sludge and landfill     wastewater application on land. The Science of the Total Environment 217:     231–239.
 Vasseur,     L. and C. Potvin. 1998. Changes in pasture community composition under an     experimental CO2 enrichment. Plant Ecology 135: 31–41.
 Vasseur, L., L. Lafrance, D. Renaud, D. Morin, T.     Audet and C. Ansseau. 1997.     Advisory committee: a powerful tool for helping decision making in     environmental issues. Environ. Manag. 21: 359–365.
 Vasseur, L., C. Cloutier, A. Labelle, J.-N. Duff and     C. Ansseau. 1996.     Responses of indicator bacteria to forest soil amended municipal sewage     sludge from aerated and non-aerated ponds. Env. Poll. 92: 67–72.
 Vasseur, L., D. Irwin and L.W. Aarssen. 1995. Size versus number of offspring as     predictors of success under competition in Lemna minor L. Ann. J. Fenn. 32: 169–178.
 Vasseur, L., L.W. Aarssen and D.L. Lefebvre. 1995. Plasticity of morphological and     allozymic traits in response to short-term environmental variation in Lemna minor. Ecoscience 1(3):     249–254.
 Vasseur,     L. and D. Gagnon. 1994. Factors controlling the survival and growth of     transplants of the understory herb Allium     tricoccum at the northern limit of its distribution. Biol. Conserv. 68:     107–114.
 Vasseur, L., T. Bennett and L.W. Aarssen. 1993. Flowering occurrence and     allozymic variation in natural populations of Lemna minor L. Amer. J. Bot. 80: 974–979.
 Vasseur, L. and L.W. Aarssen. 1992. Interpretation of adaptive plasticity in Lemna minor. Oikos 65: 233–241.
 Vasseur, L. and L.W. Aarssen. 1992. Phenotypic plasticity in a clonal plant, Lemna minor L. Plant Syst. Evol.     180: 205–219.
 Vasseur, L., L.W. Aarssen and D.D. Lefebvre. 1991. Allozymic and morphometric     variation in Lemna minor L.     Plant Syst. Evol. 177: 139–148. 
 Vasseur, L., D. Gagnon and J. P. Simon. 1990. Isoenzymatic variability among populations and varieties of wild leek. Biochem. Syst. Ecol. 18: 321- 324.

Special interests 
Vasseur is also very involved in issues related to women in science, engineering, trades and technology. On this topic, she has produced several publications on this topic as well as organized some events and projects to promote gender equality. She is the Past-President (President from 2014 to 2018) of the Canadian Coalition of Women in Engineering, Science, Trades and Technology.

References 

20th-century Canadian biologists
Canadian women biologists
1963 births
Living people
Academic staff of Brock University
People from Laval, Quebec
Scientists from Quebec
Université de Sherbrooke alumni
Université du Québec à Montréal alumni
Queen's University at Kingston alumni
20th-century Canadian women scientists
21st-century Canadian biologists
21st-century Canadian women scientists